Rochdi Chraibi (born 1962–Ouarzazate) is a senior member of the royal cabinet of king Mohammed VI of Morocco. He serves as the director of the monarch's cabinet since February 2000 and was a classmate of the Alaouite monarch at the Collège Royal.

References

Living people
1962 births
Moroccan civil servants
People from Ouarzazate
Members of the Royal Cabinet of Mohammed VI of Morocco
Alumni of the Collège Royal (Rabat)
Mohammed V University alumni
Moroccan politicians